Tetrachaetus is a genus of flies in the family Dolichopodidae, found in New Zealand. The genus was originally named by Octave Parent in 1933. However, as the genus was not designated a type species, this name was unavailable until 1989, when Daniel J. Bickel and C. E. Dyte designated Tetrachaetus bipunctatus as the type species.

Species
 Tetrachaetus bipunctatus Parent, 1933
 Tetrachaetus simplex Parent, 1933

References

Sympycninae
Dolichopodidae genera
Diptera of New Zealand
Endemic insects of New Zealand